GLG (Gerson Lehrman Group, Inc.) is a financial and global information services company headquartered in New York City. The company provides financial information and advises investors and consultants with business clients seeking expert advice. It is the world's largest expert network, with over 1,000,000 freelance consultants. GLG's experts include asset managers, investors, consultants, physicians, scientists, engineers, lawyers, senior current and former c-level executives, and former government members. GLG's clients include strategy consulting corporations, hedge funds, private equity firms, professional service firms, and non-profit organizations.

The firm was founded in 1998 and has been backed by private equity firms Silver Lake Partners, Bessemer Venture Partners, and SFW Capital Partners. GLG is headquartered in New York City, with offices in 22 cities in 12 countries.

History

Gerson Lehrman Group was founded by Yale Law School graduates Mark Gerson and Thomas Lehrman in 1998. Alexander Saint-Amand, a former Bloomberg reporter, joined GLG shortly after, and served as CEO until 2018.

GLG, initially funded by friends and family, was formed as a publishing house to produce industry guidebooks for institutional investors. However, the founders discovered that their clients wanted to talk directly to experts in casual conversations, rather than reading formal written reports. Accordingly, in 1999, GLG abandoned its publishing business and began offering subscriptions to its network of experts.

GLG's first customers were investors, and most of their growth from 1999 to 2005 was within the investment community. In 2006, they began working with big strategy consultancies and with companies in life sciences, chemicals and industrials, and technology. By 2010, The Wall Street Journal had described GLG as "dominating the U.S. expert networking industry".

The expert network business model has drawn scrutiny for concerns relating to adherence to disclosure rules and insider trading within the investment industry. GLG's policies include prohibitions against consultants sharing any nonpublic information about their employer or any public company, violating any ethical or legal restrictions relevant to consultants, or violating any laws.

In 2018, GLG named Paul Todd as its new CEO. Todd was previously the head of eBay's EMEA business.

GLG operates a Social Impact Fellowship that provides learning resources and expertise to certain nonprofits at no cost.

In October 2021 GLG filed to go public in an IPO, but it withdrew that offering in March 2022.

References

Further reading
 "Linking expert mouths with eager ears", The Economist, June 16, 2011.

Business intelligence companies
Consulting firms established in 1998
Knowledge markets
Market research companies of the United States
Privately held companies based in New York City
Research and analysis firms of the United States